The Cerrado is a vast ecoregion of tropical savanna in eastern Brazil, particularly in the states of Goiás, Mato Grosso do Sul, Mato Grosso, Tocantins, Maranhão, Minas Gerais, and the Federal District. The core areas of the Cerrado biome are the Brazilian highlands – the Planalto. The main habitat types of the Cerrado consist of forest savanna, wooded savanna, park savanna and gramineous-woody savanna. The Cerrado also includes savanna wetlands and gallery forests. The second largest of Brazil's major habitat types, after the Amazonian rainforest, the Cerrado accounts for a full 21 percent of the country's land area (extending marginally into Paraguay and Bolivia).

The first detailed European account of the Brazilian cerrados was provided by Danish botanist Eugenius Warming (1892) in the book Lagoa Santa, in which he describes the main features of the cerrado vegetation in the state of Minas Gerais.

Since then vast amounts of research have proved that the Cerrado is one of the richest of all tropical savanna regions and has high levels of endemism. Characterizing it by its enormous ranges of plant and animal biodiversity, World Wide Fund for Nature named the Cerrado the biologically richest savanna in the world, with about 10,000 plant species and 10 endemic bird species. There are nearly 200 species of mammal in the Cerrado, though only 14 are endemic.

Climate
The Cerrado's climate is typical of the wetter savanna regions of the world, with a semi-humid tropical climate. The Cerrado is limited to two dominant seasons throughout the year: Wet and dry. Annual temperatures for the Cerrado average between 22 and 27 °C and average precipitation between 80–200 cm for over 90% of the area. This ecoregion has a very strong dry season during the southern winter (approx. April–September).

Flora

The Cerrado is characterized by unique vegetation types. It is composed of a shifting mosaic of habitats, with the savanna-like cerrado itself on well-drained areas between strips of gallery forest (closed canopy tall forest) which occur along streams. Between the cerrado and the gallery forest is an area of vegetation known as the wet campo with distinct up- and downslope borders where tree growth is inhibited due to wide seasonal fluctuations in the water table.

The savanna portion of the Cerrado is heterogeneous in terms of canopy cover. Goodland (1971) divided the Cerrado into four categories ranging from least to most canopy cover: campo sujo (herbaceous layer with occasional small trees about 3 m tall), campo cerrado (slightly higher density of trees about 4 m tall on average), cerrado sensu stricto (orchard-like vegetation with trees about 6 m high) and cerradão (canopy cover near 50% with general height 9 m).

Probably around 800 species of trees are found in the Cerrado. Among the most diverse families of trees in the Cerrado are the Leguminosae (153 spp.), Malpighiaceae (46), Myrtaceae (43), Melastomataceae (32), and Rubiaceae (30). Much of the Cerrado is dominated by the Vochysiaceae (23 species in the Cerrado) due to the abundance of three species in the genus Qualea. The herbaceous layer usually reaches about 60 cm in height and is composed mainly of the Poaceae, Cyperaceae, Leguminosae, Compositae, Myrtaceae and Rubiaceae. Much of the vegetation in the gallery forests is similar to nearby rainforest; however, there are some endemic species found only in the Cerrado gallery forests.

Soil fertility, fire regime and hydrology are thought to be most influential in determining Cerrado vegetation. Cerrado soils are always well-drained and most are oxisols with low pH and low calcium and magnesium. The amount of potassium, nitrogen and phosphorus has been found to be positively correlated with tree trunk basal area in Cerrado habitats. Much as in other grasslands and savannas, fire is important in maintaining and shaping the Cerrado's landscape; many plants in the Cerrado are fire-adapted, exhibiting characters like thick corky bark to withstand the heat.

Cerrado vegetation is believed to be ancient, stretching back perhaps as far in a prototypic form as the Cretaceous, before Africa and South America separated. A dynamic expansion and contraction between cerrado and Amazonian rainforest has probably occurred historically, with expansion of the Cerrado during glacial periods like the Pleistocene. These processes and the resulting fragmentation in multiple refugia have probably contributed to the high species richness both of the Cerrado and of the Amazonian rainforest.

Fauna

The Cerrado has a high diversity of vertebrates, with 150 amphibian species, 120 reptile species, 837 bird species, and 161 mammal species recorded. Lizard diversity is generally thought to be relatively low in the Cerrado compared to other areas like caatinga or lowland rainforest although one recent study found 57 species in one cerrado area with the high diversity driven by the availability of open habitat. Ameiva ameiva is among the largest lizards found in the Cerrado and is the most important lizard predator where it is found in the Cerrado. There is a relatively high diversity of snakes in the Cerrado (22–61 species, depending on site) with Colubridae being the richest family. The open nature of the cerrado vegetation most likely contributes to the high diversity of snakes. Information about Cerrado amphibians is extremely limited, although the Cerrado probably has a unique assemblage of species with some endemic to the region.

Most birds found in the Cerrado breed there although there are some Austral migrants (breed in temperate South America and winter in the Amazon basin) and Nearctic migrants (breed in temperate North America and winter in the Neotropics) that pass through. Most breeding birds in the Cerrado are found in more closed canopy areas like gallery forests although 27% of the birds breed only in open habitats and 21% breed in either open or closed habitats. Many of the birds in the Cerrado, especially those found in closed forest, are related to species from the Atlantic rainforest and also the Amazon rainforest. The crowned solitary eagle, hyacinth macaw, toco toucan, buff-necked ibis, dwarf tinamou, and Brazilian merganser are examples of birds found in the Cerrado.

Gallery forests serve as primary habitat for most of the mammals in the Cerrado, having more water, being protected from fires that sweep the landscape and having a more highly structured habitat. Eleven mammal species are endemic to the Cerrado. Notable species include large herbivores like the Brazilian tapir and Pampas deer and large predators like the maned wolf, cougar, jaguar, giant otter, ocelot and jaguarundi. Although the diversity is much lower than in the adjacent Amazon and Atlantic Forest, several species of monkeys are present, including black-striped capuchin, black howler monkey and black-tufted marmoset.

The insects of the Cerrado are relatively understudied. A yearlong survey of the Cerrado at one reserve in Brazil found that the orders Coleoptera, Hymenoptera, Diptera and Isoptera accounted for 89.5% of all captures. The Cerrado also supports a high density (up to 4000 per hectare) of the nests of leaf cutter ants (saúvas), which are also very diverse. Along with termites, leaf cutter ants are the primary herbivores of the Cerrado and play an important role in consuming and decomposing organic matter, as well as constituting an important food source to many other animal species. The highest diversity of galling insects (insects that build galls) in the world is also found in the Cerrado, with the most species (46) found at the base of the Serra do Cipó in southeast Brazil.

History and human population

Taking advantage of the sprouting of the herbaceous stratum that follows a burning in the Cerrado, the aboriginal inhabitants of these regions learned to use the fire as a tool, to increase the fodder to offer to their domesticated animals.

Xavantes, Karajás, Avá-Canoeiros, Krahôs, Xerentes, Xacriabás were some of the first indigenous peoples occupying different regions in the Cerrado. Many groups among the indigenous were nomads and explored the Cerrado by hunting and collecting. Others practiced coivara agriculture, an itinerant type of slash-and-burn agriculture. The mixing of indigenous, quilombola maroon communities, extractivists, geraizeiros (living in the drier regions), riverbank dwellers and vazanteiros (living on floodplains) shaped a diverse local population that relies heavily on the resources of their environment.

Until the mid-1960s, agricultural activities in the Cerrado were very limited, since natural cerrado soils are not fertile enough for crop production, directed mainly at the extensive production of beef cattle for subsistence of the local market. After this period, however, the urban and industrial development of the Southeast Region has forced agriculture to the Central-West Region. The transfer of the country's capital to Brasília has been another focus of attraction of population to the central region: From 1975 until the beginning of the 1980s, many governmental subsidy programs were launched to promote agriculture, with the intent of stimulating the development of the Cerrado region. As a result, there has been a significant increase in agricultural and cattle production.

On the other hand, the urban pressure and the rapid establishment of agricultural activities in the region have been rapidly reducing the biodiversity of the ecosystems, and the population in the Cerrado region more than doubled from 1970–2010, going from 35.8–76 million.

Agriculture

The Cerrado was thought challenging for agriculture until researchers at Brazil's agricultural and livestock research agency, Embrapa, discovered that it could be made fit for industrial crops by appropriate additions of phosphorus and lime. In the late 1990s, between 14 million and 16 million tons of lime were being poured on Brazilian fields each year. The quantity rose to 25 million tons in 2003 and 2004, equaling around five tons of lime per hectare. This manipulation of the soil allowed for industrial agriculture to grow exponentially in the area. Researchers also developed tropical varieties of soybeans, until then a temperate crop, and currently, Brazil is the world's main soyabeans exporter due to the boom in animal feed production caused by the global rise in meat demand.

Today the Cerrado region provides more than 70% of the beef cattle production in the country, being also a major production center of grains, mainly soya, beans, maize, and rice. Large extensions of the Cerrado are also used for the production of cellulose pulp for the paper industry, with the cultivation of several species of eucalyptus and pines, but as a secondary activity. Coffee produced in the Cerrado is now a major export.

Charcoal production

Charcoal production for Brazil's steel industry comes in second to agriculture in the Cerrado. They actually are quite intertwined. When land is being cleared to make more land for agriculture, the tree's trunks and roots are often used in the production of charcoal, helping to make money for the clearing. The Brazilian steel industry has traditionally always used the trunks and roots from the Cerrado for charcoal but now that the steel mills in the state of Minas Gerais are among the world's largest, it has taken a much higher toll on the Cerrado. However, recently because of the conservation efforts and the diminishing vegetation in the Cerrado, they now are receiving some charcoal from the eucalyptus plantations and these efforts are growing.

Rivers
The Cerrado biome is strategic for the water resources of Brazil. The biome contains the headwaters and the largest portion of South American watersheds (the Paraná-Paraguay, Araguaia-Tocantins, and São Francisco river basins) and the upper catchments of large Amazon tributaries, such as the Xingu and Tapajós. During the last four decades, the Cerrado’s river basins have been highly impacted by extreme deforestation, expansion of the agricultural and cattle ranching frontier, construction of dams, and extraction of water for irrigation.

Conservation
The Cerrado is the second largest biome in South America and the most biodiverse savanna in the world. However, it is not currently recognized by the Brazilian Constitution as a National Heritage. It is also home to the Guarani Aquifer, stores the largest fresh water underground reservoirs in South America, and supplies water to a third of the Amazon river and the largest basins in the continent.

Brazilian agriculturalists and ministers regard it as having no conservation value, and the government has protected merely 1.5% of the Cerrado biome in Federal Reserves. By 1994, an estimated 695,000 km2 of cerrado (representing 35% of its area) had been converted to 'anthropic [sic] landscape'. In total, 37.3% of the Cerrado has already been totally converted to human use, while an additional 41.4% is used for pasture and charcoal production. The gallery forests in the region have been among the most heavily affected. It is estimated that only about 432,814 km², or 21.3% of the original vegetation, remains intact today.

During the last 25 years this biome has been increasingly threatened by industrial monoculture farming, particularly soybeans, the unregulated expansion of industrial agriculture, the burning of vegetation for charcoal and the development of dams to provide irrigation are drawing criticisms and have been identified as potential threats to several Brazilian rivers.

This industrial farming of the Cerrado, with the clearing of land for eucalyptus and soy plantations, has grown so much because of various forms of subsidy, including very generous tax incentives and low interest loans. This has resulted in the establishment of a highly mechanized, capital intensive system of agriculture. There is also a strong agribusiness lobby in Brazil and in particular, the production of soybeans in the Cerrado is influenced by large corporations such as ADM, Cargill and Bunge, these latter two directly associated with the mass deforestation of this biome.
 

One issue with expanding this reserve is that research needs to be done to choose the location of these reserves because the Cerrado biome is floristically very heterogeneous and constitutes a biological mosaic. Teams from the University of Brasília, CPAC and the Royal Botanic Garden Edinburgh have been collaborating on this project for a number of years supported by Brazilian, European Community and British funds. The project has recently been expanded into a major Anglo-Brazilian initiative, Conservation and Management of the Biodiversity of the Cerrado Biome, with UK Overseas Development Administration funding. Its aim is to survey the floristic patterns of Cerrado vegetation and to discover representative areas and biodiversity "hot-spots".

Protected areas
A 2017 assessment found that 433,581 km², or 23%, of the ecoregion is in protected areas. Protected areas in Brazil include:

 Chapada das Mesas National Park
 Emas National Park
 Grande Sertão Veredas National Park
 Nascentes do Rio Parnaíba National Park
 Serra do Cipó National Park
 Nascentes Geraizeiras Sustainable Development Reserve
 Cavernas do Peruaçu Environmental Protection Area
 Iquê Ecological Station
 Serra Geral do Tocantins Ecological Station
 Jalapão State Park
 Serra de Santa Bárbara State Park
 Pireneus State Park
 Terra Ronca State Park

as well as
 Noel Kempff Mercado National Park
in Bolivia.

References

 
 BRANDÃO, M.; GAVILANES, M. L. (1992). Espécies árboreas padronizadoras do Cerrado mineiro e sua distribuição no Estado. Informe Agropecuário 16 (173): 5–11. 
 BRANDÃO, M.; CARVALHO, P. G. S.; JESUÉ, G. (1992). Guia Ilustrado de Plantas do Cerrado.  CEMIG.
 CASTRO, A. A. J. F., MARTINS F. R., TAMASHIRO, J. Y., SHEPHERD G. J. (1999). How rich is the flora of Brazilian Cerrados? Annals of the Missouri Botanical Garden 86 (1): 192–224.
 
 RATTER, J.A.; RIBEIRO, J.F. & BRIDGEWATER, S. (1997) The Brazilian Cerrado vegetation and Threats to its Biodiversity. Annals of Botany, 80: pp. 223–230.
 LEITÃO FILHO, H.F. (1992). A flora arbórea dos Cerrados do Estado de São Paulo. Hoehnea 19 (1/2): 151–163. 
 MENDONÇA, R. C.; FELFILI, J. M.; WALTER, B. M. T.; SILVA, M. C.; REZENDE, FILGUEIRAS, T. S.; NOGUEIRA, P. E. Flora vascular do bioma Cerrado. ("Vascular flora of Cerrado biome")  IBGE
 
  Volume 1
  Volume 2

Further reading

External links

 
 
 
 
 

01
Ecoregions of Brazil
Ecoregions of Bolivia
Ecoregions of Paraguay
Ecoregions of South America
Grasslands of Brazil
Grasslands of Bolivia
Grasslands of Paraguay
Natural regions of South America
Biosphere reserves of Brazil
Environment of Goiás
Environment of Mato Grosso
Environment of Mato Grosso do Sul
Environment of Minas Gerais
Environment of Tocantins
Regions of Brazil
Regions of Bolivia
Regions of Paraguay
Regions of South America
Neotropical ecoregions
Tropical and subtropical grasslands, savannas, and shrublands